Mark Matthews, (born Mark Hamilton Attrill, 23 March 1965 in Newport, Isle of Wight, England), known by his stage name Prince Blanco, is a singer and musician based in Toronto, Canada, predominantly performing and recording in the reggae, ska and dub genre.

Early life
Mark was born in Newport on the Isle of Wight off the south coast of England. His mother was a hairdresser and his father a musician. Following his parents' divorce, his mother remarried and the family moved to southwest London where he spent most of his youth and now going by the surname 'Matthews'.

Musical background
Mark's earliest musical influences were Elvis Presley, The Rolling Stones, Slade, T. Rex and the 'Trojan' reggae sound of the seventies such as Ken Boothe and The Upsetters. However it was the punk rock of the late seventies followed by the ska revival of the early eighties that got him involved in music. Mark picked up the drums and made several unsuccessful attempts at forming bands that would fuse the sounds of reggae and punk together, similar to what groups such as Basement 5, The Ruts, The Specials and of course, The Clash were attempting at the time.

Canada
Eventually relocating to Toronto, Canada in the late eighties, Mark continued to play drums but had by this time gained recognition as a singer leading to him give up the drums and join the powerpop group Living Room as lead vocalist. After three years, a number of critically acclaimed releases and tours the band broke up and Mark left music to pursue other interests and to spend time back in England. In 1996, Matthews reappeared on the Canadian music scene as the drummer/vocalist for ska group The Skanksters who released the influential Dub Cookery album in the US in 1997. The group eventually made several lineup changes to become Boogiewall Soundsystem, releasing the album Supermyownband in 2005 which featured one of the first 'official' vocal appearances of Prince Blanco.

Prince Blanco
In the late nineties, Mark began 'moonlighting' as a solo reggae and ska vocalist and also as a member of ska/calypso group, The Liquidaires under the name Prince Blanco. Mark had travelled to Jamaica a number of times during the 1990s and on one of these trips was given the opportunity to sing onstage with reggae singer Jack Radics and legendary trombonist Vin Gordon. He was introduced onstage with a name given to him earlier that afternoon by a local Rasta named Super...'King Blanco'. Mark said he was "not worthy of being named a king" and settled for Prince Blanco – the name stuck. Over the last ten years, Prince Blanco has performed alongside artists such as Willi Williams, Michael Rose, Freddie McGregor and others. His most recent releases include the album Rebel Discothèque, two of three singles with producer Dubmatix and the Shatter The Hotel project, a benefit for Strummerville featuring various artists covering Joe Strummer compositions in a dub style. Prince Blanco's collaboration with Dubmatix, "Gonna Be Alright" won a Juno Award in 2010 for 'Best Reggae Recording'.

Personal life
Mark aka Prince Blanco lives in Toronto's west end and is married with two children. He still maintains a fairly transatlantic presence.

Selected discography

References

External links
MySpace
Shatter the Hotel

Living people
1965 births
British reggae musicians
People from Newport, Isle of Wight
Musicians from Toronto
Musicians from London